Radio became an increasingly important campaign medium in elections throughout the 1920s. By the 1920s, radio broadcasting was a viable and effective tool to reach voters beyond campaign tours and rallies. However, the rise of radio technology produced fears among governments that it could be used to radicalise public opinion and so political content was sometimes restricted.

Germany
The use of radio in elections in Germany was restricted to prevent certain parties gaining airtime. Throughout the 1920s, the Communist Party of Germany (KPD) and, to a less extreme extent, the National Socialists were banned from radio stations because they advocated the overthrow of the Weimar Republic.

1928 federal election
Right wing parties in Germany sought to make radio a conservative broadcasting medium under the guise of media neutrality. In the run up to the 1928 German federal election, Interior Minister Walter von Keudell (a DNVP member) banned all political speeches over radio, saying that political broadcasts were "not compatible with the precept that radio should not serve any party".

1929 referendum
During the campaign of the 1929 German referendum (a vote forced by nationalists in opposition to the Young Plan), Keudell's successor as Minister of the Interior, Social Democrat Carl Severing, used radio to attack the nationalists and promote the benefits of the Young Plan. The referendum failed but Severing's mobilisation of the media led to nationalists dubbing him a 'radio dictator'.

United Kingdom
The BBC was formed in 1922 as a private company. It was prohibited from producing its own news (having to rely on news from press agencies) and could only release bulletins in the evening. After the BBC's transformation into a public body in 1927, government views that the politicisation of radio could radicalise the population meant that political content was limited. So as to secure the continuation of the license fee (which was approved by Parliament), the BBC tried to avoid political matters entirely. As such, throughout the 1920s there was little political or campaign content on British radio.

Election results, however, were covered. The BBC periodically reported the results of the 1923 and 1924 elections. For the 1929 election, each of the three main party leaders were given slots to give addresses (as a precursor to party political broadcasts) and the BBC ran a programme from 9:50pm to 4:00am reporting the results.

United States

1920 US presidential election

Historically, presidential candidates had either had to campaign in person or through record albums - an 'election by phonograph'. The 1920 election was the first to be broadcast over radio, with the results of the election being covered over 18 hours on the first broadcast of KDKA, a Pittsburgh-based radio station which had gained its license just days earlier. The radio station teamed up with the Pittsburgh Post, broadcasting results as they were telephoned in to the paper; as such, listeners knew the election result (a landslide for Republican Warren G. Harding) before they were printed in the next morning's papers.

1924 US presidential election

The broadcast of the 1924 Democratic National Convention was seen as a "public relations nightmare" after it took over 100 ballots to choose a nominee. The eventual winner, John W. Davis, though an accomplished speaker, did not come across well on the radio. By the election, Davis conceded that radio had made the long speech "impossible or inadvisable" and that "the short speech will be in vogue".

The Progressive candidate, Robert M. La Follette, made "frequent use" of the radio as a campaign tool, and his Labor Day speech is credited as being the first made exclusively for radio.

Calvin Coolidge, the Republican candidate, used radio campaigning most effectively by broadcasting his speeches over several stations simultaneously rather than emulating the previous tours that candidates would do around the country. His final campaign speech was broadcast over a record 26 different stations. The Republicans understood better that radio was an entirely different medium; an internal memo noted that radio demanded "a new type of sentience" and that speeches should be kept short. Republican influence was also greater - the party spent three times more on radio campaigning than Democrats (including setting up their own radio station), and so the Republican message was heard three to four times more than that of the Democrats.

Coolidge won a decisive victory with 382 electoral votes to Davis' 136 and Follette's 13.

1928 US presidential election

Neither Herbert Hoover (the Republican candidate) nor Al Smith (the Democratic candidate) were impressive radio speakers, but both parties still spent considerable funds on radio (radio stations had started charging parties for their airtime). The methods of radio campaigning diversified during the 1928 election, with the Republicans using well-known local citizens to read a single campaign speech over 174 community radio stations and Democrats both employing vaudeville stars and creating a radio play on Smith's life to try to persuade voters. The League of Women Voters, a non-partisan organization, also sponsored a number of radio programs informing voters on the electoral process and creating the first national radio candidate forum. The programs reached around 20 million voters after being broadcast over 22 stations, and were seen as important in increasing political engagement among women in rural and remote areas.

Although Democrats outspent Republicans on radio campaigning, Hoover won a landslide victory with 444 electoral votes.

References

1920s in politics
History of radio
Radio broadcasting
1920s elections